Katakali is a village and a community of the Deskati municipality. Before the 2011 local government reforms it was part of the municipality of Chasia, of which it was a municipal district. The 2011 census recorded 176 inhabitants in the village. The community of Katakali covers an area of 15.974 km2.

See also
 List of settlements in the Grevena regional unit

References

Populated places in Grevena (regional unit)